Böyükdüz or Boyukduz may refer to:

Böyükdüz, Kalbajar, a village in the Kalbajar District of Azerbaijan
Böyükdüz, Kangarli, a village in the Kangarli District of Azerbaijan